NGC 437 is a lenticular galaxy of type S0/a located in the constellation Pisces. It was discovered on October 22, 1886 by Lewis Swift. It was described by Dreyer as "pretty faint, very small, round, faint star to northwest."

References

External links
 

0437
18861022
Pisces (constellation)
Lenticular galaxies
Discoveries by Lewis Swift
004464